Massay is a commune in the Cher department in the Centre-Val de Loire region of France.

Geography

Transport
From Monday to Saturday there are a few buses to and from Vierzon.

Population

Sights
 The church of St. Paxent, dating from the twelfth century.
 The thirteenth-century abbey buildings (Salle capitulaire). See Simon-Jérôme Bourlet de Vauxcelles, abbot of Massay
 The twelfth-century chapel of Saint-Loup.

See also
Communes of the Cher department

References

Communes of Cher (department)